The name Choi-wan (彩雲; Jyutping: coi2 wan4, [t͡sʰɔːy̯³⁵ wɐn²¹]) has been used to name four tropical cyclones in the northwestern Pacific Ocean. The name was contributed by Hong Kong, and means "colourful cloud" in Cantonese. It also refers to Choi Wan Estate, a public estate in Hong Kong.

 Typhoon Choi-wan (2003) (T0315, 16W, Roskas) – paralleled the coast of Japan.
 Typhoon Choi-wan (2009) (T0914, 15W) – moved through the Northern Mariana Islands as a Category 5 super typhoon.
 Severe Tropical Storm Choi-wan (2015) (T1523, 23W) – churned in the open ocean.
 Tropical Storm Choi-wan (2021) (T2103, 04W, Dante) - crossed the Philippines and later affected Taiwan.

References

Pacific typhoon set index articles